Amphicerus is a genus of horned powder-post beetles in the family Bostrichidae. There are about 14 described species in Amphicerus.

Species
These 14 species belong to the genus Amphicerus:

 Amphicerus anobioides (Waterhouse, 1888) i c g
 Amphicerus bicaudatus (Say, 1824) i b (apple twig borer)
 Amphicerus bimaculatus (Olivier, 1790) i c g b (grape cane borer beetle)
 Amphicerus caenophradoides (Lesne, 1895) i c g
 Amphicerus clunalis Lesne, 1939 i c g
 Amphicerus cornutus (Pallas, 1772) i c g b (powderpost bostrichid)
 Amphicerus galapaganus (Lesne, 1910) i c g
 Amphicerus hamatus (Fabricius, 1787) c g
 Amphicerus lignator (Lesne, 1899) i c g
 Amphicerus malayanus (Lesne, 1898) i c g
 Amphicerus securimentum Lesne, 1939 i c g
 Amphicerus simplex (Horn, 1885) i c g b
 Amphicerus teres Horn, 1878 i c g b
 Amphicerus tubularis (Gorham, 1883) i c g

Data sources: i = ITIS, c = Catalogue of Life, g = GBIF, b = Bugguide.net

References

External links

Bostrichidae
Taxa named by Félix Édouard Guérin-Méneville
Bostrichiformia genera